Etilamfetamine (trade names Apetinil and Adiparthrol; also known as N-ethylamphetamine) is a stimulant drug of the phenethylamine and amphetamine chemical classes. It was invented in the early 20th century and was subsequently used as an anorectic or appetite suppressant in the 1950s, but was not as commonly used as other amphetamines such as amphetamine, methamphetamine, and benzphetamine, and was largely discontinued once newer drugs such as phenmetrazine were introduced. It most likely acts primarily as a dopamine releasing agent. Its activity as a norepinephrine or serotonin releasing agent is not known.

Chemistry 
The molecular structure of ethylamphetamine is analogous to methamphetamine, with an ethyl group in place of the methyl group. It can also be considered a substituted amphetamine, with an ethyl group on the amphetamine backbone.

Recreational Use 
Ethylamphetamine can be used as a recreational drug and, while its prevalence is less than amphetamine's, it is still encountered as a substance taken for recreational purposes.

Ethylamphetamine produces effects similar to amphetamine and methamphetamine, though it is of weaker potency. At equipotent dosage, ethylamphetamine is subjectively less euphorigenic.

See also 
 3-Fluoroethamphetamine
 Dimethylamphetamine
 Fenfluramine
 Isopropylamphetamine
 Propylamphetamine

References

Notes 

Substituted amphetamines
Anorectics
Norepinephrine-dopamine releasing agents